The Pitt River Bridge is a cable-stayed bridge that spans the Pitt River between Port Coquitlam and Pitt Meadows in British Columbia, Canada. The bridge is part of Highway 7, carrying Lougheed Highway across the river. The current bridge opened on October 4, 2009. The bridge includes a 380 m cable stay bridge structure, 126 m of multi-span approaches, a 50 m interchange structure and approximately 2 km of grade construction. Total project cost for the bridge was $200 million

Previous Bridges

Three road bridges have existed before the modern bridges' construction
The first bridge was completed in 1915 and opened either on 1st or 3rd of March. It cost $800,000 (equivalent to $20,078,688.52 in 2022)  Before its construction, traffic utilized a  government subsidized ferry 
 which had started its operation on 27 September 1902. 

The second span, a highway bridge was opened on 21 October, 1957 by Premier W. A. C. Bennett and cost $1,050,000 (equivalent $10,861,824.32 in 2022 dollars).  

The third (northern) span was built in the 1978 at cost of $2.8 million dollars (equivalent to $11,554,716.98 in 2022) and was opened on 1 August by Highways Minister Alex Fraser. It was located to the north of the 1957 bridge.

The mid-swing span of the south span sometimes did not seat properly in the closed position, becoming stuck and causing very long traffic line-ups (especially before the north span was built), but this problem was fixed many years ago. The control house also operated the lane control system after the system became operational.

Each of the two spans had two lanes. In 1997 a counterflow system was installed, being completed on the 10th of October. During the morning and evening commute times, the system would reverse a lane on one of the two bridges so that three lanes of traffic were operational in a single direction. In vogue with the Massey Tunnel's system, the system directed three lanes towards Vancouver in the morning from 6 AM until 8:30 AM, and likewise from 3:30 PM until 6:00 PM towards Maple Ridge.

New bridge and Mary Hill Interchange Project
The original bridges were replaced with a cable-stayed bridge and a free-flowing interchange to replace the Mary-Hill Bypass–Lougheed intersection. On October 4, 2009, four lanes of the new bridge opened to general traffic, soon expanding to three lanes for westbound traffic and four for eastbound traffic. The new span has been engineered to allow for different lane allocations in the future, including an 8th lane and possible rapid transit. It also allows for up to 16 meters of vertical clearance for marine traffic. The new bridge structure was built between the two earlier bridges, which were subsequently demolished; all demolition was completed on November 22, 2010.

See also
Gateway Program
List of bridges in Canada

References

Cable-stayed bridges in Canada
Bridges completed in 1957
Bridges completed in 2009
Bridges in Greater Vancouver
Demolished buildings and structures in British Columbia
Pitt Meadows
Port Coquitlam
Road bridges in British Columbia
Swing bridges in Canada